Beloyarsky (Khanty: Нуви сӑңхум, Nuvi săŋhum) is a town and the administrative center of Beloyarsky District in Khanty-Mansi Autonomous Okrug, Russia, located on the Kazim River (Ob's tributary), northwest of Khanty-Mansiysk, the administrative center of the autonomous okrug. Population:

Administrative and municipal status
Within the framework of administrative divisions, it is incorporated as the town of okrug significance of Beloyarsky—an administrative unit with the status equal to that of the districts. As a municipal division, the town of okrug significance of Beloyarsky is incorporated within Beloyarsky Municipal District as Beloyarsky Urban Settlement.

Geography 
The town lies in the northern part of the Siberian Uvaly by the banks of the Kazym, a right tributary of the Ob.

Economy
The economy of the town is based on oil and natural gas extraction.

References

Notes

Sources

External links
Official website of Beloyarsky 
Beloyarsky Business Directory 

Cities and towns in Khanty-Mansi Autonomous Okrug